Ádám Farkas ( 1730 – February 12, 1786) Slovene was a Lutheran priest, poet, and rector of the lyceum in Sopron.

Farkas was born in Suhi Vrh, Moravske Toplice. He studied in Jena and Sopron. By November 1, 1785, he was rector of the Lutheran Lyceum. He also wrote poems in German and the Prekmurje dialect.

Literature 
 Vili Kerčmar: Evangeličanska cerkev na Slovenskem, Murska Sobota 1995.

See also 
 List of Slovene writers and poets in Hungary

Slovenian writers and poets in Hungary
German poets
1730 births
1786 deaths
German male poets
People from the Municipality of Moravske Toplice